Fera Airport is an airport on Fera Island in the Solomon Islands .  The airport is a roughly 3,000 foot long grass strip, and there are no roads to and from the terminal block, which was completed in April 2012. It is a 15-minute boat ride to Buala on Santa Isabel Island. Solomon Airlines flies to Fera three times weekly from Honiara.

Airlines and destinations

References

External links
Solomon Airlines Routes

Airports in the Solomon Islands